Peter Lyons may refer to:

 Peter Lyons (Virginia judge) (c. 1734–1809), judge of the Virginia Court of Appeals
 Peter Lyons (Queensland judge) (born 1946), justice of the Supreme Court of Queensland
 Peter Stanley Lyons (1927–2006), English chorister and choral conductor
 Peter B. Lyons (fl. 1960s–2010s), U.S. Assistant Secretary of Energy for Nuclear Energy

See also
Peter Lyon (born 1941), Australian rules footballer